Haystack Butte is a  summit located in the Lewis Range, of Glacier National Park in the U.S. state of Montana. It is situated one mile west of the Continental Divide, in Flathead County, above the Weeping Wall on its south slope. It can be seen from Logan Pass, and from Going-to-the-Sun Road which traverses the west and south slopes of the peak. The nearest higher neighbor is Mount Gould,  to the northeast. Climbing access is via the Highline Trail. This geographical feature's descriptive name was on maps as early as 1904, and was officially adopted March 6, 1929, by the United States Board on Geographic Names

Climate
Based on the Köppen climate classification, Haystack Butte is located in an alpine subarctic climate zone with long, cold, snowy winters, and cool to warm summers. Temperatures can drop below −10 °F with wind chill factors below −30 °F. Precipitation runoff from the peak drains into McDonald Creek, thence Lake McDonald.

Geology

Like other mountains in Glacier National Park, Haystack Butte Tail is composed of sedimentary rock laid down during the Precambrian to Jurassic periods. The bulk of the peak is composed of limestone of the Siyeh Formation, with a diorite cap.

Gallery

See also
 Geology of the Rocky Mountains
 List of mountains and mountain ranges of Glacier National Park (U.S.)

References

Lewis Range
Mountains of Flathead County, Montana
Mountains of Glacier National Park (U.S.)
Mountains of Montana
North American 2000 m summits